Dancing with Nature Spirits is an album by Jack DeJohnette with Michael Cain and Steve Gorn recorded in 1995 and released on the ECM label in 1996. The Allmusic review by Scott Yanow states, "The five group originals (two of which are over 20 minutes long) build gradually to a high level of intensity. Although there is no bass, the music swings in its own way and DeJohnnette's drums and percussion are consistently stimulating. This thoughtful but often-fiery music is worth a close listen".

Track listing 
 "Dancing With Nature Spirits" (Jack DeJohnette, Michael Cain, Steve Gorn) - 20:28
 "Anatolia" (Gorn) - 12:15
 "Healing Song for Mother Earth" (DeJohnette, Cain, Gorn) - 22:01
 "Emanations" (Cain) - 7:40
 "Time Warps" (DeJohnette, Cain) - 9:33
 Recorded at Dreamland Studios, West Hurley, NY in May 1995

Personnel 
 Jack DeJohnette – drums, percussion
 Michael Cain – piano, keyboards
 Steve Gorn – bansuri, soprano saxophone, clarinet

References 

Jack DeJohnette albums
1996 albums
ECM Records albums
Albums produced by Manfred Eicher